is a Japanese voice actor from Tokyo, Japan.

Biography

Filmography

Anime television series
The Brave Fighter of Legend Da-Garn (Mach Lander)
Captain Tsubasa (Kōzō Kira)
Geneshaft (Asimov)
Kakyūsei (Dogeza Master)
Macross (Matsuki)
Mobile Fighter G Gundam (Kennedy Grahman)
Rockman.EXE Stream (Bengel)
Slam Dunk (Aiwa Academy Coach)
The Super Dimension Fortress Macross (Haruaki Matsumoto)
Tenchi Universe (Tetta)
Urotsukidoji (Airplane Pilot, Gashim, Caeser's Colleague, Cop)

Video Games
Summon Night (Sutauto, Guramusu Bānetto)

Tokusatsu
Hikari Sentai Maskman (1987) (Skull Doguler (ep. 5))
Choujuu Sentai Liveman (1988) (Hihi Zuno (ep. 11))
Kousoku Sentai Turboranger (1989) (Inugami Boma (ep. 25))
Chikyu Sentai Fiveman (1990) (Torarugin (ep. 3), Galactic Ninja Batzlergin (ep. 24), Samejigokugin (ep. 34), Kamerezarugin (ep. 41), TeranoTVgin (ep. 43))
Tokkyuu Shirei Solbrain (1991) (Para brain A320 (ep. 1))
Choujin Sentai Jetman (1991) (Majin Mu (ep. 30))
Kyōryū Sentai Zyuranger (1992) (Dora Skeleton (ep. 2), Dora Goblin (ep. 7), Dora Ladon (ep. 13), Dora Chimaera (ep. 44))
Ninja Sentai Kakuranger (1994) (Umibouzu (ep. 23))
Ninja Sentai Kakuranger Movie (1994) (Ōnyūdō)
Blue SWAT (1994) (Zazanga (ep. 21), Gedon (ep. 31))
Chouriki Sentai Ohranger (1995) (Bara Tarantula (ep. 29))
Mirai Sentai Timeranger (2000) (Saboteur Mayden (ep. 37))
Ninpuu Sentai Hurricanger (2002) (Island Ninja Girigrigaishi (ep. 17))

External links

1954 births
Living people
Japanese male video game actors
Japanese male voice actors
Male voice actors from Tokyo